Uridine-cytidine kinase-like 1 is an enzyme that in humans is encoded by the UCKL1 gene.

References

Further reading